The seventh and final season of the American television series Agents of S.H.I.E.L.D., based on the Marvel Comics organization S.H.I.E.L.D., follows S.H.I.E.L.D. agents and allies as they try to prevent an alien occupation while stranded in time. It is set in the Marvel Cinematic Universe (MCU) and acknowledges the continuity of the franchise's films. The season was produced by ABC Studios, Marvel Television, and Mutant Enemy Productions, with Jed Whedon, Maurissa Tancharoen, and Jeffrey Bell serving as showrunners.

Clark Gregg stars as a Life Model Decoy of agent Phil Coulson, reprising his role from the film series, alongside returning series regulars Ming-Na Wen, Chloe Bennet, Elizabeth Henstridge, Henry Simmons, Natalia Cordova-Buckley, and Jeff Ward. Iain De Caestecker also appears in the season in a limited role. The final season was ordered in November 2018, ahead of the sixth season premiere, and filming took place from February to July 2019. Post-production work on the season was completed that October. The season uses time travel to explore the history of S.H.I.E.L.D., and to tie up threads left by previous seasons.

The seventh season premiered on ABC on May 27, 2020, and ran for 13 episodes until August 12, 2020. Though the season earned the series' lowest viewership, critical reception was positive. Critics commended the season's ability to explore different genres and settings through its time travel storyline and felt it served as a satisfactory conclusion for viewers, but were critical of the limited role Leo Fitz took in the season.

Episodes

Cast and characters

Main
 Clark Gregg as Phil Coulson
 Ming-Na Wen as Melinda May
 Chloe Bennet as Daisy Johnson / Quake
 Elizabeth Henstridge as Jemma Simmons
 Henry Simmons as Alphonso "Mack" Mackenzie
 Natalia Cordova-Buckley as Elena "Yo-Yo" Rodriguez
 Jeff Ward as Deke Shaw

Recurring
 Joel Stoffer as Enoch
 Tobias Jelinek as Luke
 Darren Barnet and Neal Bledsoe as Wilfred Malick
 Enver Gjokaj as Daniel Sousa
 Tamara Taylor as Sibyl
 Thomas E. Sullivan as Nathaniel Malick
 Dianne Doan as Kora

Notable guests

 Patton Oswalt as Ernest "Hazard" Koenig 
 Cameron Palatas as Gideon Malick 
 Patrick Warburton as Rick Stoner 
 Dichen Lachman as Jiaying 
 Fin Argus as Gordon 
 James Paxton as John Garrett 
 Iain De Caestecker as Leo Fitz 
 Rachele Schank as Victoria Hand 
 Briana Venskus as Piper 
 Maximilian Osinski as Davis 
 Coy Stewart as Flint

Production

Development
In November 2018, ahead of the release of its sixth season, ABC renewed Agents of S.H.I.E.L.D. for a seventh. This early renewal was a surprise following the series' low rated fifth season, but Deadline Hollywood reported that it was likely due to the cast's contract negotiations and would help reduce costs by filming the sixth and seventh seasons back-to-back. Marvel Television head Jeph Loeb said the series' crew had expected the shorter sixth season to be its last and were also surprised by the seventh season renewal. He attributed the decision to ABC watching early work on season six and believing the crew had found "another wave of energy" that they wanted to see continue.

Responding to new rumors in March 2019 that the series would end with its seventh season, Loeb stated, "We're not ending." However, ahead of the series' San Diego Comic-Con panel in July 2019, Loeb announced that the seventh season would be the series' last. He explained that the cast and crew had originally expected the series to end with the fifth season, and had put other plans on hold to make the sixth. When ABC wanted to renew the series for a seventh season, they agreed to return if it could be the final season. Having this knowledge allowed them to build the season specifically to "tie up any threads" and try to create a satisfying conclusion to the story. Although each episode of the season was allocated the same budget by ABC, the producers worked with the network to reallocate the budget across the season, to have the "backlot period costumes, which energized everybody and got everyone really excited" for the early episodes, and to save enough for the final episodes so the series could "go out with some scope and style".

Writing
Showrunners Jed Whedon, Maurissa Tancharoen, and Jeffrey Bell, as well as the series' writers, chose to use time travel in the final season because visiting earlier time periods was the "only thing left on the list" for them and it allowed them to explore the history of S.H.I.E.L.D. and revisit elements from throughout the series. The writers looked at other films and television series that have used time travel to see where they went wrong, and over or under explained concepts. They hoped to make a cohesive narrative for the season that was a "love poem" to the series and the fans. The story picks up from the sixth season's cliffhanger ending, which the writers were able to plan since the seventh season was ordered while they were working on the sixth. It features the team trying to save the world from invasion by the Chronicoms, a recurring subplot in the sixth season. The seventh season begins in 1930s New York, prior to the formation of S.H.I.E.L.D., before exploring more time periods, such as the 1950s and 1980s. Unlike earlier seasons, the seventh is not broken up into different "pods" due to its shorter 13-episode run. The writers tried to create more episodes in the season that were "outside of [their] normal form of storytelling", like the third season episode "4,722 Hours". Whedon felt that the season ended up using more of the writers' fun pitches that previously would have been dismissed, with Bell feeling the season was "more joyous" than in past seasons.

Phil Coulson is a Life Model Decoy (LMD) in the season after the events at the end of season six, despite star Clark Gregg explaining that the actual Coulson never wanted to be turned into an LMD. Gregg did not want the character to become similar to Data from Star Trek, "the cyber being following [the team] around doing fast math". The writers found a different way to approach the character while still addressing "some of the stuff that classic AI characters have dealt with in the past", such as questioning his feelings and existence. Whedon added that the Coulson LMD "feels the same" as the actual Coulson, and he goes through "some virtual soul-searching" according to Gregg. Chloe Bennet said much of the season references back to the first season and the notion that "not all heroes are super". Bennet added that Daisy Johnson is more like her Skye personality in the season now she is "more comfortable with who she is ... what she wants to do is be with the people that she loves and cares about, and save the world." Daniel Sousa becomes a love interest for Daisy in the season. Fulfilling the promise the writers had to give Daisy a love interest each season, they felt Sousa as a "man out of time" would work. Bennet was "hesitant" for her character to get another love interest, feeling her journey throughout the season was "about finding herself" and exploring her relationship with Coulson and her S.H.I.E.L.D. family. Yet, Sousa arrives and complements Daisy "in a way that she's completely taken off guard by", which Bennet felt was the only way a relationship would happen for Daisy. Sousa also forms a friendship with Alphonso "Mack" Mackenzie.

Natalia Cordova-Buckley said in the season, Elena "Yo-Yo" Rodriguez "sits back and becomes a team member", supporting Director Mack. Rodriguez has less of a personal struggle in the season than in the past "because she owns who she is and she’s now decided to be part of the force, as a unit and not as an individual". Regarding her relationship with Mack, Cordova-Buckley said the season would show "the true conclusion of their relationship, in terms of it getting really rooted and grounded". Through Deke Shaw, a man out of time, the series was able to address the various social and racial issues in the different time periods the team visits, such as him "understanding or coming to terms with the concept of white privilege or pointing out how absurd it is that there is any sort of inequality or racial inequality." The absence of Leo Fitz for much of the season allowed the writers to bring Jemma Simmons and her grandson Deke Shaw closer together. The season was built with the character's absence in mind, and with the concept, once he returned, no time would have passed for the character". Fitz's absence also "made the eventual payoff all the more powerful", as it is revealed he and Simmons have a daughter. Whedon said "we did what we could, and we tried to make it rewarding with the pieces [we were given]. Sometimes it’s 3D chess," continuing that the solution was to give the couple a "super-happy ending". The writers were always going to give Fitz and Simmons a happy ending, despite the many obstacles the couple faced throughout the series, since they were the series' "forever love". The happy ending was "a way to give the audience something that they wanted" as well.

Tancharoen said they "had no idea" the ending of the series, in which the S.H.I.E.L.D. team virtually reconnect with each other, was "predicting the near future" of Zoom calls and social distancing, which came about because of the COVID-19 pandemic. Whedon added that had the season been in development during the pandemic, a virus storyline would have been included and the season would have had a different tone.

Casting
With the season renewal, main cast members Ming-Na Wen, Chloe Bennet, Iain De Caestecker, Elizabeth Henstridge, Henry Simmons, Natalia Cordova-Buckley, and Jeff Ward were confirmed to be returning from previous seasons as Melinda May, Daisy Johnson / Quake, Leo Fitz, Jemma Simmons, Alphonso "Mack" Mackenzie, Elena "Yo-Yo" Rodriguez, and Deke Shaw, respectively. The renewal did not include series' star Clark Gregg, but Jed Whedon stated in April 2019 that the producers "firmly believe that any season would have to have him in it". The end of the sixth season revealed that a Life Model Decoy of Phil Coulson would appear in the seventh season, with Gregg starring as the new version of his character. This was the writers' solution to wanting to bring the character back without reversing the stakes of his death after the fifth season.

Despite being announced as a main cast member for the season, De Caestecker does not appear in the first ten episodes, as he was committed to other projects, creating scheduling conflicts. Whedon stated the choice was De Caestecker's, with Tancharoen adding "it was time for him to go [and] explore new things". He first appears in flashback sequences in "Brand New Day". De Caestecker received special guest star credit for his appearances in the season. 

Joel Stoffer returns from past seasons in the recurring role of Enoch, a Chronicom ally of S.H.I.E.L.D., while Tobias Jelinek appears as antagonistic Chronicom Luke, and Tamara Taylor portrays the Chronicom predictor Sibyl. The seventh season introduces the character Wilfred "Freddy" Malick, father of Gideon Malick who appeared in the third season. Wilfred is portrayed by Darren Barnet in 1931 and Neal Bledsoe beginning in 1955. Cameron Palatas reprises his role as a young Gideon Malick from the third season, while Thomas E. Sullivan takes on the role of Wilfred's other son Nathaniel, who was portrayed by Joel Dabney Courtney in the third season. In August 2019, Hayley Atwell was reported to be reprising her role as Peggy Carter alongside Enver Gjokaj as agent Daniel Sousa from the series Agent Carter. Atwell later denied that she was involved with the final season, while Gjokaj's casting was confirmed in April 2020. Whedon and Tancharoen had previously worked with Gjokaj on Dollhouse and were excited to explore his character further on Agents of S.H.I.E.L.D. Bell said Sousa would be seen in a "different light" in the season. Whedon added that having Sousa allows Coulson, a "fanboy for S.H.I.E.L.D. history", to interact with that history. Gjokaj initially said he was uncertain how long his commitment for the season would be, saying he was being used "on an episode-by-episode basis". He ultimately appears in 10 episodes in the season, and Bell later stated that it was the producer's plan to make it appear that Gjokaj would only feature in one episode of the season in order to "surprise people" when he had a recurring role. Additionally, Dianne Doan recurs as Kora, Daisy's half-sister.

In August 2019, Patrick Warburton was revealed to be reprising his season five role of Rick Stoner for the final season, and Patton Oswalt was revealed to be returning for the season in May 2020, portraying Ernest "Hazard" Koenig in 1931. He is the ancestor of the various present-day Koenig siblings that Oswalt portrayed in previous seasons. Dichen Lachman also reprises her season two role as Daisy's mother Jiaying, while Fin Argus plays a young version of Gordon, an Inhuman working with Jiaying. Philip Labe portrayed young Gordon in the second season, while Jamie Harris portrayed him as an adult. In July 2020, Gregg discussed actors that he wished could return for the seventh season, including Bill Paxton who portrayed John Garrett in the series' first season before his death in February 2017. Gregg said it would be "really amazing if there was some way to feel like we had the spirit of Bill Paxton with us" and teased that could happen in the season. Later that month, Paxton's son James Paxton was revealed to be guest starring in the season as a younger version of John Garrett. Briana Venskus, Maximilian Osinski, and Coy Stewart reprise their roles from previous seasons, respectively as Piper, Davis, and Flint, in the series finale. Rachele Schank also appears as a young Victoria Hand, a S.H.I.E.L.D. agent, who was portrayed in the first season by Saffron Burrows.

Design

Costumes
Costume designer Whitney Galitz was joined by Jessica Torok during the season, before Torok took over after Galitz left the series to give birth to her daughter.

Title sequence
Nearly every episode features title cards reflective of the time period visited throughout the season. The first two episodes, "The New Deal" and "Know Your Onions", have an "old-style noir" title card reflecting the 1930s setting of the episodes, while the third episode features a title card with font that "appears to be lifted from a classic alien invasion movie", evoking the style of 1950s "classic sci-fi". The fourth episode, again set in the 1950s, has a film noir style, including being in black and white and featuring an opening sequence that is an homage to Sunset Boulevards (1950) "iconic" opening. The episode's title card is a "throwback-style credit intro". For "A Trout in the Milk", a 1970s-themed opening was used, and was the first opening sequence of the series to include "actual opening credits" along with voiceover introductions. Each actor's name featured clips of their character from past seasons. The seventh episode sees "Marvel's Agents of S.H.I.E.L.D." being typed on a black computer screen, referencing the "tech and hacker movies" of the 1980s. "After, Before" introduces an opening sequence the evokes Tron (1982) and Back to the Future (1985). The bright blue logo "travels across a black digital landscape made up of an orange and blue grid" which features coordinates, dates, and ticking clocks.

Filming
Production for the season began at the end of February 2019, in Culver City, California. Elizabeth Henstridge made her directorial debut with the episode "As I Have Always Been", which she said was "different than anything [the series has] done before", resulting in it being shot "in a whole new way". Filming wrapped on July 30, 2019. Post-production work on the final episode was completed around October 7, 2019.

Music
After contributing additional music to earlier seasons, Jason Akers is credited as co-composer for the seventh season alongside the series' original composer Bear McCreary. McCreary said Akers "knew the show like an encyclopedia", and added that he was grateful that he decided to promote Akers as co-composer because of the many "creative and logistical challenges" that the pair faced during the season. The composers introduced a new time travel theme in the season that uses  time. It was created to be a "consistent and memorable" through line for all the various musical genres featured in the season, which include "1940s noire saxophones, 1950s theremin, 1970s wah-wah guitar and bongos, and 1980s synths". The two composers worked to blend each of these different styles with the series' "pre-established classic orchestra and contemporary electronics".

Marvel Cinematic Universe tie-ins
In August 2019, Whedon and Tancharoen indicated that there would be a connection to the MCU in the final season. The various time periods visited in the season allowed the writers to incorporate different Marvel-related Easter eggs. In the third episode, which features Daniel Sousa, references are made to the second season of Agent Carter, including the defeat of Hugh Jones and the Council of Nine. The fifth episode depicts "Project Insight", a major plot point in Captain America: The Winter Soldier (2014), as taking place in the 1970s due to the Chronicoms changing history.

Instead of using the Quantum Realm to travel between different points in time as depicted in Avengers: Endgame (2019), the characters initially follow the Chronicoms through "tides", which are "critical launch windows leading to specific points in time and space". Discussing the apparent inconsistencies with Endgame earlier in the season, Thomas Bacon from Screen Rant noted that the time travel rules in the film were changed during production and were not completely consistent within that film, and opined that the series' explanation could help clarify the film's rules. Bacon suggested that the film's explanation that changing the past cannot change the future aligned with the series' idea that small ripples in the timestream would not change the overall flow of time, while the film's statement that removing the Infinity Stones from the timeline would create alternate realities with significant changes aligned with the series' idea that large changes would create a different future. As the season progresses, the S.H.I.E.L.D. team and the Chronicoms ultimately alter events in the past, creating a new timeline. After doing so, the team tries to ensure events in this new timeline happen correctly, such as protecting Jiaying from Nathaniel Malick to ensure Daisy is born. Jamie Jirak at ComicBook.com felt this was consistent with Endgames time travel rules. In the season finale, Fitz confirms that the team was operating in a branched timeline and helped them return to the original timeline by traveling through the Quantum Realm.

Marketing
The first footage of the season was released in August 2019 at the D23 Expo. A new teaser and poster for the season were released to coincide with the season's premiere date announcement in mid-April 2020, with the poster featuring an "old-school" 1950s S.H.I.E.L.D. logo due to the season returning to that era via time travel. A week later, the main poster for the season was released featuring art by Kyle Lambert. The poster depicts the season's main cast members in costumes from the different time periods that are visited throughout the season, with Marvel specifically asking Lambert to reflect the costumes and sets that were created for the series. The poster marketed the season as "The Final Mission". Jake Abbate at SuperHeroHype and Sam Stone of Comic Book Resources both compared the poster to the work of movie poster artist Drew Struzan.

Release

Broadcast
The seventh season began airing on ABC in the United States on May 27, 2020, and ran for 13 episodes, until August 12, 2020. In the United Kingdom, E4, which had aired the series since season three, announced they had no plans to air season seven. The season was instead released on Disney+, starting with the first two episodes on November 13, 2020, and the remaining episodes following weekly.

Home media
The season began streaming on Netflix in the United States on October 30, 2020, and was available until February 28, 2022. It became available on Disney+ in the United States on March 16, 2022, joining other territories where it was already available on the service.

Reception

Ratings

Critical response
The review aggregator website Rotten Tomatoes reports a 100% approval rating, with an average score of 8/10, based on 15 reviews. The website's consensus reads, "Heartfelt and held together by the strength of its super cast's chemistry, Agents of S.H.I.E.L.D.s final season is a fitting farewell to a beloved team." 

Alex McLevy of The A.V. Club felt the season was giving off "strong Legends of Tomorrow vibes", saying, "The rollicking nature of its time-travel adventures, fused with a slightly more absurdist sensibility than past seasons, is giving these episodes the feel of a victory lap, the show loosening up and enjoying its high-concept potential without the worry of delivering the goods to ensure another year." Ian Cardona of Comic Book Resources felt by having Coulson return (albeit as an LMD) and once again utilizing Hydra as an antagonist brought the series "back-to-basics" while still maintaining the fun nature of the series. Each member of the team was allowed "to shine" and "the focus is solely on the characters and the mission, which helps to create a tightly-knit adventure that doesn't waste any time." Dave Vitagliano from Den of Geek said, "Even though season seven doesn’t rank among the series’ best efforts, taken as a whole, Agents of S.H.I.E.L.D. ends its 136-episode run as one of the most successful science fiction superhero television offerings and earns top grades overall."

Writing for io9, Rob Bricken felt by following Avengers: Endgame, which used time travel to adjust and determine the continuity of the MCU, allowed the season to benefit from Endgames "decision to free the MCU from the shackles of continuity. The show has been able to go through its Legends of Tomorrow-esque jaunt through the 20th century with the freedom to tell whatever story it wants and leave as many chronal messes as that story needs," making the season "become as good and fun as the show’s ever been." Bricken concluded that the time travel of the season could have looked "very different" had Endgame not done it first, since "Disney, ABC, and Marvel Studios wouldn’t have approved anything that even appeared like the TV series was having some effect on the MCU proper, no matter how minor." Given the impact the COVID-19 pandemic had on delaying the start of Marvel Studios' Phase Four out of 2020, Ani Bundel of Collider called the season "Marvel’s best release of 2020", despite being treated "as an afterthought". Bundel added it was "remarkable" the season was able to succeed in acknowledging elements from seasons past without leaving anything out, and felt the including Sousa was a successful tribute to Agent Carter. Bundel concluded the season "happily stepped up to fulfill fans’ expectations, just as it has tirelessly for years. It's a triumphant ending for a series everyone wrote off at one point or another."

Absence of Fitz
Fitz does not appear in the season until the eleventh episode, due to De Caestecker committing to another project when the season started filming. Ian Sandwell at Digital Spy felt it was "a mistake" to have Fitz and Simmons apart, with it feeling "as though Fitz is missing because it's what the show does – and not because it's a necessary story mechanic." Sandwell felt with the couple separated, as a "key element" of the series, it was hard for the final season to be the "victory lap and celebration" it should. After the fifth episode of the season, McLevy said "the show better start paying dividends... on [the FitzSimmons] story, because it has cut its own legs out from underneath by dragging out Fitz’s absence this long." While sympathetic to De Caestecker taking time to work on other projects, McLevy called the extended absence "ridiculous" at the halfway point of the season, since Fitz's absence "isn’t making for great drama any more... By trying to have its keep-the-best-couple-apart cake and eat its mysterious-transformation too, Agents of S.H.I.E.L.D. lessens the impact of both. Right now, it’s just [Jemma Simmons] failing to express any concern for the biggest person in her life, and without revealing the causes for that, the storyline gradually deflates from the delay." McLevy later added the "couple was the biggest emotional investment the show ever created, and they’ve just sputtered it out in the final two seasons." Syfy Wires Trent Moore stated it was "impossible to overestimate how much [Fitz's] presence has been missed this year". On the prospect of potentially seeing Fitz in the eleventh episode, Entertainment Weeklys Christan Houlb said, "this better be one of the greatest plot twists of all time to justify leaving one of the show's central characters out of the entire final season and crippling the show's most compelling relationship in the process."

Accolades
In July 2020, TVLine listed Agents of S.H.I.E.L.D. as one of the 15 best television series of 2020 so far, explaining that "expectations were measured" for the seventh season but it had proven itself to be "downright fantastic, totally fun and, with each passing episode, an affirmation of" the series' place within the wider MCU.

References

General references

External links
 

 
2020 American television seasons
Television series about multiple time paths
Television series set in 1931
Television series set in 1955
Television series set in 1973
Television series set in 1976
Television series set in 1982
Television series set in 1983
Television series set in 2019
Television series set in 2020